CDP may refer to:

Places 
 Census-designated place, an unincorporated area in the U.S. for which census data is collected
 Cuddapah Airport (IATA identifier: CDP), Andhra Pradesh, India

Technology 
 Cache Discovery Protocol, an extension to the BitTorrent file-distribution system
 Certificate in Data Processing, a professional certification conferred by the ICCP
 Charger Downstream Port, a type of battery-charging USB port
 Cisco Discovery Protocol, a proprietary data link network protocol developed by Cisco Systems
 Columbia Data Products, formerly a computer manufacturer, now a software company
 Composers Desktop Project, non-realtime audio digital-signal processing (DSP) software
 Content delivery platform, a system for managing and deploying web content
 Continuous Data Protection, whereby computer data is continuously backed up
 Customer data platform, marketer-based management system for customer profiles

Science and medicine 
 Coronary Drug Project, a trial of treatments for coronary heart disease
 Cytidine diphosphate, a nucleotide

Political parties 
 Centrist Democratic Party of the Philippines
 Congress for Democracy and Progress, a political party of Burkina Faso
 Constitutional Democratic Party (disambiguation)
 Christian Democratic Party (Australia)

Other uses 
 Carbon Disclosure Project, of greenhouse gas emissions
 Cassa Depositi e Prestiti, investment bank of Italy
 Center for Domestic Preparedness, a U.S. government emergency response training facility
 Châteauneuf-du-Pape AOC, a French wine appellation
 Coeur de Pirate, a leading Canadian writer and singer of popular music in French and English, real name Béatrice Martin, born Montreal 1989
 Collateralized debt position, a type of structured asset-backed security
 Collett Dickenson Pearce, a British advertising agency

See also